Tree skink is primarily the common name of members of the skink genus Dasia.

It can also refer to:

Cryptoblepharus, also known as snake-eyed skinks or shining-skinks
Lamprolepis, also known as emerald skinks
Niveoscincus, also known as snow skinks or cool skinks
Prasinohaema, also known as green-blooded skinks
Egernia striolata, the Australian tree skinks

Animal common name disambiguation pages